Prodigy (David Alleyne) is a superhero appearing in American comic books published by Marvel Comics, commonly in association with the X-Men. Prodigy is a student at the Xavier Institute, member of the New X-Men squad, and, for a time, a member of the Young Avengers.

Publication history
Created by writers Nunzio DeFilippis and Christina Weir and artist Keron Grant, David Alleyne first appeared in New Mutants (vol. 2) #4 (October 2003). He was originally a mutant with the ability to absorb the knowledge and skills of anyone within a limited distance. He could not control this ability and would forget his acquired knowledge once they became out of range. He attends the Xavier Institute and becomes co-leader of the New Mutants training squad. After the events of House of M and the ensuing "Decimation" of mutants, David loses his powers, but he remains at the institute, becoming a member of the New X-Men team and utilizing his natural intellect to assist his teammates. He later regains all the knowledge and skills he had absorbed before becoming depowered, including many of the X-Men's considerable expertise in science and physical combat, making him a stronger addition to the X-Men. Despite being human, he remains with the X-Men as a substitute instructor and trainee for stories over a number of years. He later regains his powers through the use of the resurrection protocols.

Fictional character biography

Early life and moving to the Xavier Institute
David Alleyne is a naturally intelligent boy, who finds upon becoming a teenager that the answers to his exams and assignments begin appearing in his head whenever he is in the same room as his teachers. He realizes that he is a mutant with the ability to know anything that the people nearby know. Wanting to retain this knowledge, David becomes driven to study even harder. He takes college-level courses while finishing high school and drops subtle hints to his family about his powers, but they fail to realize he is a mutant until the campus anti-mutant group ousts him. Realizing he can no longer be a mutant in secrecy, David accepts an invitation from Danielle Moonstar to attend the Xavier Institute for Higher Learning. His parents and sister are supportive of his decision.

At the school he befriends Wind Dancer, Wallflower and Wither. They are attacked by the Reavers, and afterwards Dani makes David roommates with one of these Reavers, Josh Foley. The tactic works, and David soon comes to regard Josh as a little brother. Along with his other friends at the school, they bring to Xavier Institute the homeless mutant Surge, who David acquires an immediate interest in.

David, Josh, Surge, Wind Dancer, Wallflower, and Wither are placed on Dani's squad of students, called "the New Mutants," and David is given the codename Prodigy. Not liking the idea that he is being groomed to be an X-Man, David declines to be the team leader, leaving the position to Wind Dancer. However, she quickly loses faith in her ability to lead. They compromise by becoming team co-leaders. Believing that he is a combat liability because the knowledge from his mutant power is transient, Prodigy learns from Emma Frost that he has a mental block that prevents him from permanently retaining knowledge. David experiences a telepathic illusion created by Dani and Emma of a possible future based on removing the block. In it, David excels by gaining the knowledge of the most important and intellectual individuals in the world, bringing a near-utopia to the globe, through genocide and the killing of his friends and the X-Men. The illusion ends with Surge, his wife, overloading her powers, killing them both in order to stop him. On seeing the illusion, he rejects having his mental blocks removed and begins to avoid Surge. However, she later confronts him, stating that what he saw was only an illusion of his worst fears, and David begins a relationship with her.

Power loss and the New X-Men
In the "Decimation" storyline following the events of House of M, David is one of the many mutants who loses his powers because of the Scarlet Witch. Planning to leave the school, David reveals that he built a "Danger Cave" to replace the destroyed Danger Room before he lost his powers. The facility allows his teammates to train by reliving former X-Men missions. David's parents and Cyclops decide that it would be safer for David to remain at the mansion since William Stryker is targeting depowered mutants as well. When Stryker attacks the mansion, David saves the Stepford Cuckoos and is wounded by one of the Purifiers. He joins the New X-Men later when they leave to fight the mutant-hunting future Sentinel, Nimrod. David proves useful to the team when he attacks the robot with the heavy artillery. After returning to the mansion, he is invited to join his girlfriend Surge in running the New X-Men squad, giving them free rein to add more members at their will.

In the "Quest for Magik" storyline, the demon Belasco senses Magik's returned presence due to her temporary revival during House of M, but cannot locate her and fails to magically revive her (instead creating the dark, soulless form of Illyana called Darkchilde, whom he banishes in disgust). Sensing her presence on the students at the Institute due to their involvement with her in the "House of M" reality, he incapacitated the X-Men and sucks the students into Limbo, including David, whose eyesight was healed to normal vision by Josh using his newly acquired medical expertise. Belasco interrogates David about her whereabouts, but since none of the students remember the House of M reality, he is confused and tells her that she is still dead. Enraged, Belasco kills David by ripping out his heart. Some of the students break free and attack Belasco, while Josh manages to immediately regrow David's heart with his powers, bringing him back to life. While the students battle against Belasco, David realizes that his weakness is telepathy, having put special helmets to block the telepathic powers of Stepford Cuckoos and Martha Johansson. David directs X-23 to free the Cuckoos, who launch a telepathic attack on Belasco. Though initially successful, the Cuckoos are forced out of Belasco's mind, but he is ultimately defeated by Pixie and Darkchilde. The students are later returned to Earth by Darkchilde, when she seals off all entrances to Limbo.

Regaining knowledge and skills
Prodigy and Surge's relationship comes to an end soon after.  Learning of David's near-death experience in Limbo, Surge fears for his safety and attempts to force him to leave the school by kissing Hellion in front of him. David prepares to leave, but is confronted by the Cuckoos, who offer to remove his mental blocks as thanks for saving them during Stryker's attack, restoring all the past knowledge and skills he absorbed when he had his powers. Though he can no longer absorb other people's knowledge, he now possesses the collective knowledge and skills of every individual he absorbed before the onset of Decimation, including Beast's vast medical and technological expertise and the elite fighting skills of several of the X-Men. Using Krav Maga martial arts picked up from Wolverine and Shadowcat, he displays his newfound assets by besting Hellion in combat, fully aware that the kiss had just been a ploy.  He then breaks up with Surge and is appointed as a substitute instructor by Cyclops.

In the X-Men crossover event X-Men: Messiah Complex, the X-Men, the Marauders, Predator X, as well as the anti-mutant Purifiers all race to recover the first mutant child born since M-Day, who was kidnapped from her hometown. Thinking the Purifiers may have the baby, Surge leads the New X-Men in a mission against to attack the Purifiers' base and recover her. Prodigy declines participation and stays behind at the school, viewing the mission to be largely out of vengeance against the Purifiers for their murdered schoolmates than to truly locate the baby. While the New X-Men are away on their mission, the school is attacked by O*N*E Sentinels controlled by Cassandra Nova's nano-bots. Prodigy assists Beast in the hospital wing stabilizing the severely injured students and faculty. He later repairs Cerebro with the Cuckoos, who state that they find the structure of his brain fascinating.

Manifest Destiny & Utopia
After the events of Messiah Complex, the X-Men disband and later reform in San Francisco. Prodigy relocates with the X-Men to assist Beast in setting up Cerebro. He continues to work with the X-Men, though he is no longer on any active teams, instead running the new Danger Room and assisting the X-Men during the Skrull invasion and the take over of San Francisco by Norman Osborn and his Dark X-Men as well as joining the rest of the mutants to the Mutant island Utopia where he assists Cyclops keeping the island maintained. He is later seen in the field helping out Hellion and Surge deal with the resurrected Rusty Collins.

Second Coming
Cyclops leaves Prodigy in charge of surveillance of the island's resources after a barrage of attacks by Bastion. Beast and Prodigy access a dome placed over Utopia and San Francisco and come to the conclusion that the dome is able to send over hundreds of thousands of Nimrods over to kill the X-Men and remaining mutants, causing him to break down emotionally.

Schism and Regenesis
When a giant Sentinel attacks Utopia, Prodigy joins in the fight along with the other students to help destroy it. When Wolverine decides to leave Utopia and return to Westchester to reopen the school, Prodigy is among the younger X-Men who choose to stay at Utopia.

Young Avengers
Bitter and disillusioned at Cyclops' manipulation, David is later seen working at a superhuman call center, where he uses his knowledge to help various people solve superhuman crises. While employed there, he meets and befriends Tommy Shepherd, the former Young Avenger Speed. The two work together on a stakeout to catch a thief dressed as Patriot, but the plan goes awry when the criminal dissipates Tommy's body and then fades away. He joins the Young Avengers to help them find Speed and while stranded in another dimension with Hulkling, he kisses him. In issue #9 he reveals he is bisexual. After the main villain of the Vol was eliminated, he was talking to Patri-not and came up with a theory that he will become Patri-not in the future. During this he accidentally kisses the entity, allowing Tommy to reappear. Their relationship is later revisited in Lords Of Empyre: Emperor Hulkling, where they are seemingly together.

Prodigy is featured in the 'Original Sins' five-issue limited series. Marvel Boy, Prodigy and Hulkling become involved in the plans by the Hood to siphon off cosmic knowledge endangering innocent people. There are multiple betrayals and back-tracking, as the heroes are convinced the knowledge driving the civilians mad could be safely converted into data that helps all of humanity.

It is shown later that Prodigy auditions to be the security expert at the new Stark Industries, though he loses the job to Ant-Man.

Prodigy enrolls in the extra-dimensional Sotomayor University. He develops a close friendship with the superhero America Chavez. He helps protect the university from multiple threats, external and internal. Prodigy makes his own friends, such as with the Sotomayor fraternity called 'The Betas' and an outside group of allies unofficially known as the 'Chavez Guerrillas'.

Dawn of X
After regaining his powers through the use of Krakoa's resurrection protocols, Prodigy has recently joined a new X-factor team, assembled to investigate suspicious mutant deaths before said resurrection protocols can be utilized on them. He and Forge take part in a automobilistic race with Krakoan organic technology. He also comforts Wolfsbane (Rahne Sinclair) about the impossibility of resurrecting her half-god child with Asgardian Hrimhari. He also cameos with other mutants (Frenzy, Storm, Bling! and Nezhno) in T'Challa's line of defense of Wakanda against an invasion.

In the one-shot Lords of Empyre: Emperor Hulkling, written by Chip Zdarsky and queer author Anthony Oliveira, around Empyre, Marvel's summer 2020 crossover event, Oliveira brings Prodigy and Speed into canon as a gay couple out drinking with Hulkling, who describes that they "always have exactly one and a half drinks and start making out".

Powers and abilities
Prodigy has the telepathic ability to absorb and mimic the knowledge and skills from the minds of the people in close proximity to him. A side effect of his powers are self-imposed mental blocks, which prevents him from retaining the knowledge he absorbs, forgetting whatever he has learned after a short period of time. The power is completely involuntary, and absorbs only studied knowledge, not thoughts, short-term information, or awareness.

Since losing his powers, he maintains a high intellect, due to his extensive studying prior to coming to Xavier's. He creates a Danger Cave, a training room for the rest of his peers, and shows an extensive knowledge of the past missions of the X-Men. When the mental blocks in his mind are removed by the Stepford Cuckoos, David later regains access to all the skills and knowledge that he absorbed when he was still a mutant. He can recall the fighting abilities and scientific knowledge of many of the X-Men including Beast's medical knowledge, Forge's and Professor Xavier's expertise in various subjects, Wolverine and Kitty Pryde's martial arts, etc. He has since regained his powers without losing all of the above knowledge. Recently, thanks to the Krakoa Resurrection Protocols, he has had his psychomimetic powers restored.

Along with his intellect, Prodigy has displayed great competency as a leader. Both Cyclops and Danielle Moonstar have acknowledged his leadership skills.

Other versions

House of M
In the "House of M" universe, David was once more a member of the New Mutants. The New Mutants were a group of young mutants trained to be diplomats, and David graduated the valedictorian. Prodigy once more acts as the leader of the New Mutants  (although in this case it's more unofficial). He leads the New Mutants in an attempt to save Nori's father. While initially conflicting with rival group the Hellions, the two groups would join after learning of tortures of humans. David, along with the rest of the surviving New Mutants and the Hellions, would later make their last stand against Sunfire and his army.

Too Much Information
In the New X-Men storyline "Too Much Information," David asks Emma Frost and Danielle Moonstar to remove the mental blocks keeping him from retaining the knowledge he absorbs. Unknown to David at the time, it was an illusion created by Dani, which was enhanced by Emma Frost's telepathic abilities to show him what might happen if the blocks were removed.

In the illusion, David quickly surpasses all the teachers at the school, having permanently retained all the knowledge they possessed. David leaves the institute, telling Josh Foley (Elixir) that he would use Josh's healing power to heal every disease known to mankind for free. Three months later, David has gained the knowledge of Stephen Hawking, Tony Stark, Henry Kissinger, and many other prominent geniuses simply by passing near them. He announces at a press conference that he has cures for AIDS, cancer and every other known disease. He plans to distribute this cure across the entire country in a matter of weeks. However, these cures come at a high price, as Josh dies during the medical procedure that harvested the tissue from his body needed for the cures. David mourns his friend, but firmly believes that his unwilling sacrifice was just.

Eighteen years later, David has married former teammate Surge, been elected President of the United States, eliminated poverty, unemployment, and discrimination against mutants and has nearly created a worldwide government. The only major holdout is China, which he plans to bomb via teleportation. Noriko secretly shares this information with the X-Men in hopes that they can prevent a mass genocide. However, before they can act on this information, David sends them on a false mission to investigate a satellite that he causes to explode, killing them. Seeking a convenient scapegoat, he declares that the already outlaw Hellions are terrorist threats and blames them for killing the X-Men. The Hellions and reformed New Mutants join forces when many of the dark secrets of David's rise to power come to light. The combined groups (Hellion, Mercury, Tag, Rockslide, Wither, Wind Dancer, Icarus, Surge, and Wallflower) stage an assault on the White House, but David's security forces (XSE agents, Bishop, Storm, and Angel Salvadore) kill most of the heroes. In the end, Noriko confronts David in the Oval Office, then uses her powers to destroy the White House and everyone remaining in it.

Though an illusion, it had a lasting effect on how he viewed his powers.

X-Men: The End
Prodigy briefly appears in X-Men: The End, as an agent of the X.S.E. Along with Iceman, he interrogates Sage. Prodigy absorbs all the information she knows, and is deeply troubled with what he finds out. When joined by Val Cooper, he reveals that she is an impostor. She responds by transforming into a Warskrull, killing Prodigy shortly after.

References

External links
 Prodigy at Marvel Wiki

Comics characters introduced in 2003
African-American superheroes
Avengers (comics) characters
Fictional characters from Illinois
Marvel Comics telepaths
Marvel Comics martial artists
Marvel Comics mutants
Marvel Comics male superheroes
Fictional bisexual males
Marvel Comics LGBT superheroes
New Mutants
Characters created by Nunzio DeFilippis
Characters created by Christina Weir
Marvel Comics child superheroes
Teenage superheroes